Jefferson Street Historic District is a national historic district located at Gary, Indiana.  The district encompasses 81 contributing buildings in an exclusively residential section of Gary. They were largely built between 1922 and 1945, and many reflect the American Small House Movement.  Architectural styles include examples of Colonial Revival, Tudor Revival, Late Gothic Revival, Spanish Colonial Revival, and Bungalow / American Craftsman architecture.

It was listed in the National Register of Historic Places in 2013.

References

Historic districts on the National Register of Historic Places in Indiana
Houses on the National Register of Historic Places in Indiana
Colonial Revival architecture in Indiana
Tudor Revival architecture in Indiana
Gothic Revival architecture in Indiana
Mission Revival architecture in Indiana
Historic districts in Gary, Indiana
National Register of Historic Places in Gary, Indiana